Hewitsonia ugandae is a butterfly in the family Lycaenidae. It is found in Cameroon, Gabon, the Democratic Republic of the Congo (Uele, Tshopo and Tshuapa) and western Uganda.

Subspecies
Hewitsonia ugandae ugandae (Democratic Republic of the Congo (Uele, Tshopo, Tshuapa), western Uganda)
Hewitsonia ugandae jolyana Bouyer, 1997 (Cameroon, Gabon)

References

Butterflies described in 1962
Poritiinae
Taxa named by Thomas Herbert Elliot Jackson